Racetrack Records is an American record label, music studio, and production company founded by Vin Diesel.

References

American record labels
Hip hop record labels